Netflix is an American over-the-top content platform and production company.

In 2013, Netflix became the first streaming platform whose tv production won a Primetime Emmy Award with House of Cards becoming the first online-only streaming television series to receive major nominations for the 65th Primetime Emmy Awards. House of Cards scored nine nominations overall, including Outstanding Drama Series. Meanwhile, its first episode, "Chapter 1", received four nominations, becoming the first webisode (online-only episode) of a television series to receive a major Primetime Emmy Award nomination. Laray Mayfield and Julie Schubert won Outstanding Casting for a Drama Series while Eigil Bryld won for Outstanding Cinematography for a Single-Camera Series (One Hour); meanwhile, David Fincher won for Outstanding Directing for a Drama Series. Both Bryld and Fincher won for the episode "Chapter 1", making it the first Emmy-winning webisode; Jeff Beal was also nominated for Outstanding Music Composition for a Series (Original Dramatic Score) for the same episode. The series was nominated for Outstanding Drama Series four more times, receiving nominations for its first five seasons; however, it wasn't nominated for its sixth and final season.

In 2014, Orange Is the New Blacks first season was submitted and nominated for Outstanding Comedy Series while the second season received a nomination for Outstanding Drama Series, becoming the first series to be nominated for both categories. The first season also earned nominations for Outstanding Writing for a Comedy Series and Outstanding Directing for a Comedy Series, for the episodes "I Wasn't Ready" and "Lesbian Request Denied", respectively.

In 2020, programs produced by Netflix set an all-time record by receiving 160 nominations, the most nominations produced by a single network in a single year. In total, programs produced by the streaming service received over 600 nominations and won 112; 3 wins of 14 nominations in 2013, 7 wins of 31 nominations in 2014, 2 wins of 34 nominations in 2015, 9 wins of 54 nominations in 2016, 20 wins of 91 nominations in 2017, 23 wins of 112 nominations in 2018, 27 wins of 118 nominations in 2019, and 21 wins of 160 nominations in 2020.

Drama

Drama Series
In 2013, House of Cards became the first television series from a streaming service to be nominated for an Emmy Award. In 2014, the Political drama received its second nomination. A year later, Orange Is the New Black was nominated for its first season and House of Cards for its third season. House of Cards was nominated for the fourth consecutive time in 2016. During the ceremony of 2017, three series received nominations in the category: House of Cards, The Crown, and Stranger Things. Both, The Crown and Stranger Things repeated nominations in 2018. In 2019, Bodyguard, and Ozark received nominations. During 2020, Ozark, Stranger Things and The Crown received nominations for its third season. In 2020, Bridgerton made its debut in the category and The Crown was nominated for its fourth season.

Lead Actor/Actress
Lead Actor in a Drama Series
In 2013, Kevin Spacey was nominated for his role as Frank Underwood in House of Cards. The following year, the actor received a nomination for the second season of the series. In 2015, Kyle Chandler was nominated in the category alongside Kevin Spacey; both actors repeated nominations in 2016. Kevin Spacey was nominated for the fifth season of House of Cards, in 2017. Jason Bateman was nominated three consecutive times, from 2018 to 2020. He was the only lead nominated in the category during that period. In 2021, Regé-Jean Page and Josh O'Connor, received their first Emmy nomination. Bateman returned to the category in 2022 alongside Lee Jung-jae, who received his first nomination. 

Lead Actress in a Drama Series
Robin Wright was the only lead nominated, from 2013 to 2016. In 2017, Wright received her fifth nomination and Claire Foy received her first. In 2018, Foy won for her role as Queen Elizabeth II in The Crown. She became the first actress from a series produced by Netflix to win. During the 70th Primetime Emmy Awards, Laura Linney was nominated for the second season of Ozark and received additional nominations in 2020 and 2022. Robin Wright received a nomination for the last season of House of Cards. In 2020, Laura Linney and Olivia Colman were nominated. During 2021, Emma Corrin was nominated for her role as Princess Diana and Olivia Colman as Queen Elizabeth II, in The Crown.

Supporting Actor/Actress

Supporting Actor in a Drama Series
Michael Kelly and Ben Mendelsohn were nominated in the category in 2015. In 2016, both Kelly and Mendelsohn received nominations, with Mendelsohn winning the award. In 2017, John Lithgow won for his role as Winston Churchill in The Crown. Michael Kelly and David Harbour were nominated. During the 2018 ceremony, Matt Smith received his first Emmy nomination for the second season of The Crown. In addition, David Harbor was nominated for the second season of Stranger Things. In 2019, Michael Kelly was nominated for the final season of House of Cards. For his role in The Crown, Tobias Menzies, won the award in 2021. Both Park Hae-soo and O Yeong-su received their first nominations in 2022 for Squid Game.

Supporting Actress in a Drama Series
Uzo Aduba won her second Emmy for Orange Is the New Black in 2015. Aduba and Millie Bobby Brown received nominations during the 69th Primetime Emmy Awards. In 2018, Vanessa Kiby and Millie Bobby Brown were nominated. Julia Garner won two consecutive years, 2019 and 2020, for her role as Ruth Langmore in Ozark and won a third time in 2022 for the show's final season. In 2020, Helena Bonham Carter was nominated for her role as Princess Margaret in the third season of The Crown and received another nomination in 2021 alonsgisde co-stars Emerald Fennell, and eventual winner Gillian Anderson. HoYeon Jung received her first nomination in 2022 for her work on Squid Game.

Guest Actor/Actress
Guest Actor in a Drama Series
Reg E. Cathey was nominated in 2014 and won in 2015. Pablo Schreiber received a nomination for portraying George "Pornstache" Mendez in Orange Is the New Black. During the 2016 ceremony, Mahershala Ali, Paul Sparks, and Reg E. Cathey were nominated for House of Cards. Ben Mendelsohn received a nomination for the last season of Bloodline. In 2018,  Cameron Britton was nominated for Mindhunter  and Matthew Goode for The Crown. Andrew Scott was nominated, in 2020, for Black Mirror. During the 73rd Primetime Creative Arts Emmy Awards,  Charles Dance received a nomination for his role as Lord Mountbatten in The Crown. 

Guest Actress in a Drama Series
In  2014, Kate Mara received a nomination for her role in House of Cards. The following year, Rachel Brosnahan was nominated for the third season of the series. In 2016,   Ellen Burstyn and Molly Parker received nominations for the fourth season of House of Cards. At the 2017 ceremony, the streaming service scored two nominations, with Shannon Purser for Stranger Things and Laverne Cox for Orange Is the New Black. Cox was nominated in 2019 and 2020. In 2021, Claire Foy won her second Emmy for The Crown. In addition, Sophie Okonedo was nominated for Ratched. Lee Yoo-mi won on her first nomination in 2022 for her work on Squid Game.

Directing and Writing
 Outstanding Directing for a Drama Series
In 2013, David Fincher won for his work in House of Cards. The Duffer Brothers received two nominations for the first and second seasons of Stranger Things. The Crown has received six nominations, winning twice. Ozark was nominated six times, with Jason Bateman winning in 2019. Both, Bridgerton and Squid Game, were nominated for its debut seasons. Directors of Netflix's programs received eighteen nominations, winning four times. 

 

 Outstanding Writing for a Drama Series
Writers of Netflix's programs received their first writing nomination in 2013, with House of Cards. In 2017, The Crown and Stranger Things scored nominations for its debut season. Both shows received nominations for its second season. Jed Mercurio was nomianted for his work in Bodyguard. In 2020, Ozark received three nominations for episodes "All In", "Boss Fight", and "Fire Pink". Peter Morgan was nominated for seasons three and four of The Crown, winning the latter. In 2022, Hwang Dong-hyuk was nominated for writing episode "One Lucky Day" from the first season of Squid Game.

Cinematography 
House of Cards won for Outstanding Cinematography for a Single-Camera Series (One Hour) in 2013. The series was also nominated for seasons two, three, and four. In 2017, The Crown, Sense8 and Stranger Things were each nominated for the award. In 2018, Adriano Goldman, from The Crown, won for his work on the episode "Beryl"; Goldman was also nominated in 2017 and 2020. Meanwhile, Ben Kutchins was nominated twice for Ozark in 2018 and 2020.

Picture Editing
House of Cards received nominations for seasons one and two. In 2016, Leo Trombetta was nominated for his work in Narcos. Dean Zimmerman won in 2017 for Stranger Things. Meanwhile, Kevin D. Ross was nominated for two consecutive years for episodes "Chapter Seven: The Bathtub" and "Chapter Nine: The Gate". Ozark received three nominations. In 2021, The Crown scored two nominations.

Casting

Comedy Series

Lead Actor/Actress

Supporting Actor/Actress
Outstanding Supporting Actor in a Comedy Series
In 2015, Tituss Burgess received his first Emmy nomination for his performance on the first season of Unbreakable Kimmy Schmidt. Burgess also received nominations for seasons two, three, and four, for a total of four consecutive nominations. Alan Arkin was nominated for the first and second season of The Kominsky Method, in 2019 and 2020 respectively. In 2021, Paul Reiser received a nomination for his supporting role in the final season of The Kominsky Method.

Outstanding Supporting Actress in a Comedy Series
In 2014, Kate Mulgrew was nominated for her role as Galina "Red" Reznikov in Orange Is the New Black. Jane Krakowski received a nomination for the first season of  Unbreakable Kimmy Schmidt. In 2018, Betty Gilpin was nominated for GLOW. In 2019 and 2020, Gilpin was nominated for seasons two and three, respectively.

Guest Actor/Actress
Outstanding Guest Actor in a Comedy Series
In 2015, Jon Hamm was nominated for his performance as Richard Wayne Gary Wayne in Unbreakable Kimmy Schmidt. During the 73rd Primetime Creative Arts Emmy Awards, Morgan Freeman received a nomination for his guest appearance in season three of The Kominsky Method.

Outstanding Guest Actress in a Comedy Series

In 2014, Uzo Aduba, Laverne Cox and Natasha Lyonne were nominated for the first season of Orange Is the New Black, with Aduba winning. Laverne Cox became the first transgender person to be nominated for an Emmy in año acting category. The following year, Tina Fey received a nomination for the debut season of Unbreakable Kimmy Schmidt. Angela Bassett was nominated for Master of None, and Bette Midler for The Politician.

Directing and Writing
Outstanding Directing for a Comedy Series
In 2014, Jodie Foster was nominated for directing the episode "Lesbian Request Denied", from Orange Is the New Black. Aziz Ansari was nominated in 2016 for the first season of Master of None. In 2018, Jesse Peretz received a nomination for GLOW. 

Outstanding Writing for a Comedy Series

In 2014, writers Liz Friedman and Jenji Kohan were nominated for Orange Is the New Black. Aziz Ansari and Alan Yang won for writing "Parents" from Master of None. The following year, Lena Waithe made history when she won in the category becoming the first black female to do so. In 2019, Russian Doll received two nominations for writing.

Cinematography
Cinematography for a Multi-Camera Series
The Ranch won the award for seasons one, three, and four, and nominated for season two. Donald A. Morgan is the cinematographer nominated for each season.

Cinematography for a Single-Camera Series (Half-Hour)
In 2018, The End of the F***ing World and GLOW were nominated; the former received a second nomination in 2020. Russian Dolls Chris Teague won for his work on the episode "Ariadne" in 2019.

Picture Editing
Multi-Camera Picture Editing for a Comedy Series

Single-Camera Picture Editing for a Comedy Series

Casting

Limited Series/Movie

Limited or Anthology Series
In 2018, Godless produced by Netflix scored a nomination for Outstanding Limited Series. The following year, When They See Us, also produced by Netflix, received 11 nominations; the series is produced by Robert De Niro, Ava DuVernay, Jonathan King, Jane Rosenthal, Jeff Skoll, Berry Welsh, and Oprah Winfrey.

Television Movie 
A Very Murray Christmas was nominated for Outstanding Television Movie in 2016. In 2017, Black Mirror won by submitting "San Junipero" as a movie. A year later, the series won again by using the same strategy with the episode "USS Callister". In 2019, the movie Black Mirror: Bandersnatch won the same award, achieving a third consecutive win for a television movie steeamed by Netflix.
Outstanding Television Movie

Lead Actor/Actress
Lead Actor in a Limited Series or Movie
In 2015, Ricky Gervais was nominated for Derek: The Special. Three years later, Jesse Plemons was nominated for Black Mirror: "USS Callister". During the 71st Primetime Emmy Awards, Jharrel Jerome won for his portrayal of Korey Wise in the limited series When They See Us, becoming the first Afro–Latin American to win for an acting category.

Lead Actress in a Limited Series or Movie
In 2018, Michelle Dockery was nominated for Godless while Regina King won for her performance in Seven Seconds. The following year, Aunjanue Ellis and Niecy Nash were both nominated for When They See Us. In 2020, Shira Haas and Octavia Spencer were nominated for their roles in Unorthodox and Self Made, respectively.

Supporting Actor/Actress
Supporting Actor in a Limited Series or Movie
In 2018, Jeff Daniels won Outstanding Supporting Actor in a Limited Series or Movie for his performance in Godless. The following year, Asante Blackk, John Leguizamo, and Michael K. Williams were all nominated for When They See Us. In 2020, Tituss Burgess received a nomination for the special Kimmy vs the Reverend. Dylan McDermott and Jim Parsons were nominated for their roles in the miniseries  Hollywood.  

Supporting Actress in a Limited Series or Movie
In 2018, Merritt Wever won in the category for her role in Godless. Meanwhile, Letitia Wright was nominated for Black Mirror: "Black Museum". In 2019, Marsha Stephanie Blake and Vera Farmiga were both nominated for When They See Us.

Directing and Writing
Directing for a Limited Series, Movie, or Dramatic Special
In 2018, Scott Frank was nominated for his directorial work on the limited series Godless. In 2019, Ava DuVernay was nominated for directing the four episodes of When They See Us. In 2020, Maria Schrader won for directing Unorthodox.

Writing for a Limited Series, Movie, or Dramatic Special
Black Mirror has won the award for writing two consecutive years; the first win was for "San Junipero" (by Charlie Brooker) while the second was for "USS Callister" (by William Bridges and Brooker). In 2018, Scott Frank was nominated for writing Godless, and Kevin McManus and Michael McManus were nominated for American Vandal. The following year, When They See Us was nominated for the episode "Part Four", written by Ava DuVernay and Michael Starrbury. In 2020, Michael Chabon, Susannah Grant and Ayelet Waldman were nominated for "Episode 1" of Unbelievable while Anna Winger received a nomination for "Part 1" of Unorthodox.

Cinematography

Picture Editing

Casting

Short Form

Short Form Comedy or Drama Series
In 2019, It's Bruno!, produced by Amanda Bowers, Molly Conners, Vincent Morano and Solvan "Slick" Naim, was nominated. Special was also nominated that year; the series is produced by Anna Dokoza, Eric Norsoph, Ryan O'Connell, Jim Parsons, and Todd Spiewak.

Actor in a Short Form Comedy or Drama Series
In 2019, sixth-place finisher Ryan O'Connell became the fifth nominee in the category after Jonathan Banks' nomination was revoked. It was determined that several episodes were shorter than two minutes, violating the Academy of Television Arts & Sciences' rule that six episodes air during the eligibility period with a runtime of at least two minutes.

Actress in a Short Form Comedy or Drama Series
In 2019, Special scored two nominations in the category with actresses Jessica Hecht and Punam Patel, for the first season of the series.

Nonfiction

Documentary Series/Special
In 2016, Laura Ricciardi and Moira Demos won for the documentary series Making a Murderer. Chef's Table has been nominated three times without winning. During the 70th Primetime Creative Arts Emmy Awards, Wild Wild Country became the second Netflix's production in win the award. The following year, Our Planet, won the third award in the category. In 2020, Tiger King: Murder, Mayhem And Madness was nominated.

Documentary or Nonfiction Special
In 2014, The Square was nominated for Outstanding Documentary or Nonfiction Special. The following year, Virunga, received a nomination in the category. In 2016, What Happened, Miss Simone? became the first Netflix's original to win in this category. During the 2017, 13th won.

Hosted Series
My Next Guest Needs No Introduction with David Letterman received an Emmy nomination for its first season in 2018. After Netflix acquired Comedians in Cars Getting Coffee, the web series was nominated for its season 10 and 11. In 2020, Ugly Delicious, received a nomination.

Reality Program
Structured Reality Program
Queer Eye has won the award three consecutive years, from 2018 to 2020.  Tidying Up with Marie Kondo and Love Is Blind received nominations in 2019 and 2020, respectively. 

Unstructured Reality Program
In 2019, Somebody Feed Phil was nominated. During the 2020 ceremony, Kevin Hart: Don't F**k This Up received a nomination and Cheer won the first Emmy for Netflix in the category. Cheer was produced by Greg Whiteley, Andrew Fried, Dane Lillegard, Jasper Thomlinson, Bert Hamelinck, Adam Leibowitz, Arielle Kilker and Chelsea Yarnell.

Competition Program
Nailed It! was nominated in 2019, 2020 and 2021. It has been the only Netflix's original to be nominated for Outstanding Competition Program

Directing and Writing
Directing for a Documentary/Nonfiction Program
In 2014, Jehane Noujaim won for Outstanding Directing for a Documentary/Nonfiction Program for The Square. Moira Demos and Laura Ricciardi won an Emmy for directing the episode "Fighting for Their Lives" from  Making a Murderer. David Gelb received a nomination for Chef's Table. What Happened, Miss Simone?s director, Liz Garbus, was nominated in 2016. Ava DuVernay was nominated for her work on the documentary film, 13th. In 2018, Bryan Fogel scored an Emmy nomination for Icarus, and Chapman Way and Maclain Way for Wild Wild Country. During the 72nd Primetime Emmy Awards, Steven Bognar and Julia Reichert won for  American Factory.

Directing for a Reality Program
In 2019, Hisham Abed won for directing the episode "Black Girl Magic", from Queer Eye. the following year, Abed scored another nomination for Queer Eye. Greg Whiteley won an Emmy for directing Cheer. 

Writing for a Nonfiction Programming
In 2016, Making a Murderer won for Outstanding Writing for a Nonfiction Programming for its first season. 13th, written by Ava DuVernay and Spencer Averick, won in 2017; Amanda Knox and Bill Nye Saves the World were also nominated. The following year, Icarus scored a nomination while the series Our Planet was nominated in 2019. In 2020, Don't F**k with Cats: Hunting an Internet Killer won; Circus of Books was also nominated.

Cinematography

Cinematography for a Reality Program
Queer Eye was nominated for seasons one, two, and the special We're in Japan!: Japanese Holiday. Garrett Rosey was the cinematographer nominated.

Picture Editing
Picture Editing for a Nonfiction Program

Picture Editing for a Structured Reality or Competition Program

Picture Editing for an Unstructured Reality Program

Casting
Queer Eye has been nominated for Outstanding Casting for a Reality Program three consecutive years, winning in 2018 and 2019. Love Is Blind was nominated in 2020.

Animated Program
Outstanding animated program
In 2019, Big Mouth and BoJack Horseman were nominated for an Emmy. In 2020, both series received a second nomination in the category.

Outstanding short form animated program
In 2019 and 2021, Love, Death & Robots received a nomination for Outstanding Short Form Animated Program.

Variety Program
Variety Special (Pre-Recorded)
In 2017, the stand-up comedy specials Louis C.K. 2017 and Sarah Silverman: A Speck of Dust received a nomination. The following year, Netflix scored two nominations in the category with Steve Martin & Martin Short: An Evening You Will Forget for the Rest of Your Life and Dave Chappelle: Equanimity. In 2019, Hannah Gadsby: Nanette, Homecoming: A Film by Beyoncé, Springsteen on Broadway, and Wanda Sykes: Not Normal received a nomination. In 2020, five Netflix originals were nominated in the category with Dave Chappelle: Sticks & Stones winning.

Directing and Writing
Directing for a Variety Special
In 2018, Stan Lathan was nominated for Dave Chappelle: Equanimity, Michael Bonfiglio for Jerry Seinfeld: Jerry Before Seinfeld, and Marcus Raboy for Steve Martin & Martin Short: An Evening You Will Forget for the Rest of Your Life. Ed Burke and Beyoncé Knowles-Carter received a nomination for their work on Homecoming: A Film by Beyoncé. Thom Zimny won for directing Springsteen on Broadway. In 2020, Stan Lathan won en Emmy for Dave Chappelle: Sticks & Stones. 

Directing for a Variety Series
During the 72nd Primetime Emmy Awards, Linda Mendoza received a nomination for directing the episode "Flame Monroe", from the variety series Tiffany Haddish Presents: They Ready.

Writing for a Variety Special
In 2016, Patton Oswalt won for his special Patton Oswalt: Talking for Clapping, meanwhile John Mulaney was nominated for John Mulaney: The Comeback Kid. In 2017, Louis C.K. and Sarah Silverman were nominated for their own individual specials. In 2018, John Mulaney won for his special John Mulaney: Kid Gorgeous at Radio City; Patton Oswalt: Annihilation (by Patton Oswalt) and Steve Martin & Martin Short: An Evening You Will Forget for the Rest of Your Life (by Steve Martin and Martin Short) were also nominated. In 2019 and 2020, out of five nominated Netflix specials, Hannah Gadsby and Dave Chappelle won for writing their respective specials.

Picture Editing

Voice-Over/Narrator/Host
Character Voice-Over Performance
In 2017, Mo Collins was nominated for her voice work in F Is for Family. Kristen Schaal received a nomination for BoJack Horseman. During the 71st Primetime Emmy Awards, Kevin Michael Richardson scored a nomination for F Is for Family. In 2020, Maya Rudolph won for her performance in the animated series Big Mouth. 

Narrator
In 2017, Meryl Streep won for narrating the episode "The Price of Victory", of Five Came Back. In 2019, David Attenborough won the award for Our Planet. 

Host

Costumes
Contemporary Costumes

Fantasy/Sci-Fi Costumes

Costumes for a Variety, Nonfiction, or Reality Programming

Period Costumes

Music

Composition
Music Composition for a Series

Limited or Anthology Series, Movie or Special

Music Composition for a Documentary Series or Special

Direction/Supervision
Music Direction

Music Supervision

Sound Editing/Mixing
Sound Editing for a Limited or Anthology Series, Movie or Special

Statistics

Individuals with most nominations

See also
Main
 List of accolades received by Netflix

Others
 List of TCA Awards received by Netflix
 List of BAFTA Awards received by Netflix
 List of Golden Globe Awards received by Netflix
 List of Daytime Emmy Awards received by Netflix
 List of Screen Actors Guild Awards received by Netflix
 List of Critics' Choice Television Awards received by Netflix
 List of Primetime Creative Arts Emmy Awards received by Netflix

References

Lists of accolades received by Netflix
Primetime Emmy Award winners